John James Blackman (25 November 1911 – December 1987) was an English professional footballer who played in the Football League for Crystal Palace and Queens Park Rangers as a forward. He also played non-league football for Guildford City.

Playing career
Blackman began his senior career at Queens Park Rangers and in October 1935, signed for Crystal Palace, then playing in the Football League Third Division South. He made a goal-scoring  debut in November in a home 5–0 win against Millwall and went on to make 27 appearances that season scoring 19 times. Blackman made 29 appearances in each of the next two seasons scoring 12 and 16 goals respectively and 14 appearances (5 goals) in 1938–9. Regular league football was then suspended due to World War II but Blackman went on to play Wartime League football for Palace up until 1946. In May 1946, Blackman moved on to Guildford City and remained with the club for one season. After retiring from football, he served as a trainer and physiotherapist at Millwall in the 1960s.

Personal life
Blackman died in 1987, aged 76.

References 

Bibliography

External links
 Blackman at holmesdale.com

1911 births
1987 deaths
Footballers from Bermondsey
English footballers
Association football forwards
English Football League players
Queens Park Rangers F.C. players
Crystal Palace F.C. players
Guildford City F.C. players
Millwall F.C. non-playing staff
Aldershot F.C. wartime guest players
Millwall F.C. wartime guest players
Charlton Athletic F.C. wartime guest players
Brighton & Hove Albion F.C. wartime guest players
Luton Town F.C. wartime guest players
Clapton Orient F.C. wartime guest players